Hardwoodlands  is a community in the province of Nova Scotia, Canada, located in The Municipality of the District of East Hants in Hants County. Hardwoodlands remains a rural community today. The main road Highway 14 (Hardwoodlands Rd.) connects the community to the Trans-Canada Highway and to the other rural community Nine Mile River.

References
Hardwood Lands on Destination Nova Scotia

Communities in Hants County, Nova Scotia
General Service Areas in Nova Scotia